St. Johns or Saint Johns is the largest city and county seat of Clinton County in the U.S. state of Michigan. The population was 7,698 at the 2020 census.

St. Johns is located in the north of Clinton County, surrounded by Bingham Township (although the two are administered independently). St. Johns has been nicknamed the "Mint Capital of the World".

Geography
The city is situated in Bingham Township, but is administratively autonomous. A mixture of rich forests, plains and farmland (uniquely, mint fields) make up the St. Johns area, providing ample opportunity for outdoor sports and agriculture.

Demographics

2010 census
As of the census of 2010, there were 7,865 people, 3,147 households, and 2,011 families residing in the city. The racial makeup of the city was 93.9% White, 1.4% African American, 0.6% Native American, 0.5% Asian, 0.1% Pacific Islander, 1.2% from other races, and 2.3% from two or more races. Hispanic or Latino of any race were 4.6% of the population.

There were 3,147 households, of which 32.8% had children under the age of 18 living with them, 45.2% were married couples living together, 14.0% had a female householder with no husband present, 4.7% had a male householder with no wife present, and 36.1% were non-families. 30.5% of all households were made up of individuals, and 13% had someone living alone who was 65 years of age or older. The average household size was 2.38 and the average family size was 2.95.

The median age in the city is 37.2. 25.4% of residents were under the age of 18; 8.5% were between the ages of 18 and 24; 26.5% were from 25 to 44; 24.1% were from 45 to 64; and 15.6% were 65 years of age or older. The gender makeup of the city was 47.7% male and 52.3% female.

Culture 

The Wilson Center Auditorium on Cass Street puts on rock concerts and theatrical productions throughout the year. To date, they have brought in acts such as David Dondero, Hailey Wojcik, and Doug Mains and the City Folk.

Mint production 

Near the turn of the century, high demand for mint oil in medicines and candy from companies like Wrigley caused a surge in demand for mint farming. The rich, organic, muck soil of Clinton County makes the area around St. Johns particularly well-suited for mint farming. As a result, many mint farmers cultivated mint. The Crosby Mint Farm, established by J.E. Crosby in 1912, claims to be the oldest continuously family-operated mint farm in the United States.

Today Clinton County ranks first in Michigan in regards to total mint production.
St. Johns is known as the Mint City and has been called "The Mint Capital of the World."

Each year since 1985, St. Johns celebrates its mint farming heritage with the St. Johns Mint Festival. The festival typically takes place on the second weekend in August.

Transportation

Highways
 connects north to Mt. Pleasant, and Grayling. Southward, it passes through Lansing and Jackson en route to Ohio. It provides a direct connection to I-69 and I-96.
 is a business loop traveling through the city.

Airports
 Scheduled passenger air carrier flights are available from Capital Region International Airport, in south-central Clinton County.

Notable people

Robert Asprin, science fiction and fantasy author
Roy Beechler, football player and coach 
Leo Burnett, advertising executive
Myrtelle Canavan, pathologist, discovered Canavan Disease
Voltairine de Cleyre, anarchist writer and feminist
Eric Esch,  commonly referred to as Butterbean, former fighter
 The Houghton brothers, creators of Big City Greens
Andrew Kehoe, perpetrator of the Bath School Disaster
Philip Orin Parmelee, aviator
Oliver L. Spaulding, Civil War general in the 23rd Michigan Volunteer Infantry Regiment, politician, and regent of the University of Michigan
Oliver Lyman Spaulding, U.S. Army brigadier general
Lee Upton, poet, fiction writer, and literary critic
Lola Carrier Worrell, composer

Places of interest 

Paine-Gillam-Scott Museum – Home of the Clinton County Historical Society. Built in 1858, the house holds the distinction of being the oldest brick residence in the city of St. Johns.
Clinton Northern Railway Museum - Located in the former Grand Trunk Depot, the museum focuses on railroad history and its impact on small-town America. The museum features several restored railway cars.
IQhub at Agroliquid – Center for agricultural history, innovation and exploration. The IQhub is located inside AgroLiquid's world headquarters in St. Johns, Michigan. The 9,500 square foot agriculture education destination is home to exhibits chronicling the advancement of agriculture, from before the Europeans arrived in the Americas through the present day.

Registered Historic Buildings in St. Johns 

Sites marked with a dagger (†) have been demolished.

Climate
This climatic region is typified by large seasonal temperature differences, with warm to hot (and often humid) summers and cold (sometimes severely cold) winters.  According to the Köppen Climate Classification system, St. Johns has a humid continental climate, abbreviated "Dfb" on climate maps.

Crime rate 

Crime in St. Johns is significantly lower when compared to the national average, and average-to-high when compared to surrounding cities.

Violent Crime Rate in 2012 (higher number means more dangerous)
 U.S. Average: 214
 St. Johns: 95.5
 Laingsburg: 279.8
 Ovid: 58.9
 Elsie: 79.6
 Dewitt: N/A
 Lansing: 422.7

Reported Incidents from 2001–2012 in St. Johns, MI:
 Rape: 35
 Arson: 9
 Motor vehicle theft: 70
 Assault: 55
 Burglaries : 366

See also
National Register of Historic Places listings in Clinton County, Michigan
List of Michigan State Historic Sites in Clinton County

References

External links 
 
Clinton County Arts Council
Clinton Northern Railway

Cities in Clinton County, Michigan
County seats in Michigan
Lansing–East Lansing metropolitan area
Populated places established in 1853
1853 establishments in Michigan